

L

La – Le 

 

 

Laachite (zirconolite: IMA2012-100) 4.0  [no] 
Labuntsovite (labuntsovite) 9.CE.30e
Labuntsovite-Fe (IMA1998-051a) 9.CE.30e   [no]
Labuntsovite-Mg (IMA1998-050a) 9.CE.30e   [no]
Labuntsovite-Mn (IMA2000 s.p., 1955) 9.CE.30e   [no]
Labyrinthite (eudialyte: IMA2002-065) 9.CO.10   
Lacroixite (titanite: 1914) 8.BH.10    (IUPAC: sodium aluminium fluoro phosphate)
Laffittite (IMA1973-031) 2.GA.35    (IUPAC: silver mercury arsenide trisulfide)
Laflammeite (IMA2000-014) 2.BC.60    (IUPAC: tripalladium dilead disulfide)
Laforêtite (chalcopyrite: IMA1995-006) 2.CB.10a    (IUPAC: silver indium disulfide)
Lafossaite (IMA2003-032) 3.AA.25    (IUPAC: thallium chloride)
Lagalyite (IMA2016-106) 4.0  [no] [no]
Lahnsteinite (ktenasite: IMA2012-002) 7.0  [no]  (IUPAC: tetrazinc hexahydro sulfate trihydrate)
Laihunite (IMA1988-xxx, 1976) 9.AC.05   
Laitakarite (tetradymite: IMA1967 s.p., 1959) 2.DC.05    (IUPAC: tetrabismuth triselenide)
Lakargiite (oxide perovskite: IMA2007-014) 4.CC.30   [no] (IUPAC: calcium zirconium trioxide)
Lakebogaite (IMA2007-001) 8.EA.20   [no]
Lalondeite (gyrolite: IMA2002-026) 9.EE.85   
Lammerite (IMA1980-016) 8.AB.30    (IUPAC: tricopper diarsenate)
Lamprophyllite (seidozerite, lamprophyllite: 1894) 9.BE.25  [no] [no]  (IUPAC: trisodium (strontium sodium) trititanium heptaoxodisilicate dioxidedihydroxyl)
Lanarkite (Y: 1832) 7.BD.40    (IUPAC: dilead oxide sulfate)
Landauite (crichtonite: IMA1965-033) 4.CC.40   
Landesite (reddingite: IMA1964 s.p., 1930 Rd) 8.CC.05    (IUPAC: nonamanganese(II) triiron(III) trihydro octaphosphate nonahydrate)
Långbanite (IMA1971 s.p., 1888) 9.AG.10   
Långbanshyttanite (IMA2010-071) 8.0  [no] [no] (IUPAC: dilead dimanganese magnesium tetrahydro diarsenate hexahydrate)
Langbeinite (langbeinite: 1891) 7.AC.10    (IUPAC: dipotassium dimagnesium trisulfate)
Langhofite (IMA2019-005) 7.0  [no] [no]
Langisite (nickeline: IMA1968-023) 2.CC.05    (IUPAC: cobalt arsenide)
Langite (Y: 1864) 7.DD.10    (IUPAC: tetracopper hexahydro sulfate dihydrate)
Lanmuchangite (alum: IMA2001-018) 7.CC.20    (IUPAC: thallium aluminium disulfate dodecahydrate)
Lannonite (IMA1979-069) 7.DF.40   
Lansfordite (Y: 1888) 5.CA.10    (IUPAC: magnesium carbonate pentahydrate)
Lanthanite (lanthanite) 5.CC.25 (IUPAC: diREE tricarbonate octahydrate)
Lanthanite-(Ce) (IMA1983-055) 5.CC.25   
Lanthanite-(La) (IMA1987 s.p., 1845) 5.CC.25   
Lanthanite-(Nd) (IMA1979-074) 5.CC.25   
Lapeyreite (IMA2003-023b) 8.0   [no] (IUPAC: tricopper oxydi(hydroxoarsenate) monohydrate)
Laphamite (orpiment: IMA1985-021) 2.FA.30    (IUPAC: diarsenic triselenide)
Lapieite (IMA1983-002) 2.GA.25    (IUPAC: copper nickel antimonide trisulfide)
Laplandite-(Ce) (IMA1974-005) 9.DJ.10   
Laptevite-(Ce) (IMA2011-081) 9.0  [no] 
Larderellite (larderellite: 1854) 6.EB.05   
Larisaite (IMA2002-061) 4.JH.25   
Larnite (Y: 1929) 9.AD.05    (IUPAC: β-dicalcium (tetraoxy silicate))
Larosite (IMA1971-014) 2.LB.35   
Larsenite (Y: 1928) 9.AB.10    (IUPAC: lead zinc (tetraoxy silicate))
Lasalite (lasalite: IMA2007-005) 4.HC.05   
Lasnierite (IMA2017-084) 8.0  [no] [no]
Latiumite (latiumite: 1953) 9.EG.45   
Latrappite (double perovskite: IMA1964-019) 4.CC.30   
Laueite (laueite, laueite: 1954) 8.DC.30    (IUPAC: manganese(II) diiron(III) dihydro diphosphate octahydrate)
Laumontite (zeolitic tectosilicate: IMA1997 s.p., 1805) 9.GB.10   
Launayite (madocite: IMA1966-021) 2.LB.30   
Lauraniite (IMA2019-049) 7.0  [no] [no]
Laurelite (IMA1988-020a) 3.DC.20    (IUPAC: heptalead dodecafluoride dichloride)
Laurentianite (IMA2010-018) 9.0  [no] 
Laurentthomasite (milarite: IMA2018-157) 9.0  [no] [no]
Laurionite (Y: 1887) 3.DC.05    (IUPAC: lead hydro chloride)
Laurite (pyrite: 1866) 2.EB.05a    (IUPAC: ruthenium disulfide)
Lausenite (Y: 1928) 7.CB.70    (IUPAC: diiron(III) trisulfate pentahydrate)
Lautarite (Y: 1891) 4.KA.05    (IUPAC: calcium diiodate)
Lautenthalite (devilline: IMA1983-029) 7.DE.70    (IUPAC: lead tetracopper hexahydro disulfate trihydrate)
Lautite (Y: 1881) 2.CB.40    (IUPAC: copper arsenide sulfide)
Lavendulan (lavendulan: 1837) 8.DG.05    (IUPAC: sodium calcium pentacopper chloro tetrarsenate pentahydrate)
Låvenite (wöhlerite: 1884) 9.BE.17   
Laverovite (astrophyllite: IMA2017-009b) 9.DC.  [no] [no]
Lavinskyite (plancheite: IMA2012-028) 9.0  [no] [no] (K(LiCu)Cu6(Si4O11)2(OH)4)
Lavoisierite (ardennite: IMA2012-009) 9.0  [no] 
Lavrentievite (IMA1984-020) 2.FC.15a    (IUPAC: trimercury dichloro disulfide)
Lawrencite (Y: 1845) 3.AB.20    (IUPAC: iron(II) dichloride)
Lawsonbauerite (IMA1979-004) 7.DD.40    (IUPAC: nonamanganese(II) tetrazinc docosahydro disulfate octahydrate)
Lawsonite (lawsonite: 1895) 9.BE.05    (IUPAC: calcium dialuminium (heptaoxy disilicate) dihydroxyl monohydrate)
Lazaraskeite (IMA2018-137) 10.0  [no] [no] (IUPAC: bis(glycolato)copper(II))
Lazarenkoite (IMA1980-076) 4.JC.10    (IUPAC: calcium iron(III) triarsenic(III) heptaoxide trihydrate)
Lazaridisite (IMA2012-043) 7.0  [no] [no] (IUPAC: tri(cadmium sulfate) tetrahydrate)
Lazulite (IMA1967 s.p., 1795) 8.BB.40    (IUPAC: magnesium dialuminium dihydro diphosphate)
Lazurite (IMA20-H, 1891) 9.FB.10    Note: all known lazurites seem to be a variety of haüyne (Moore & Woodside, 2014)
Lead (19th century for native lead, probably) 1.AA.05   
Leadamalgam (amalgam: IMA1981-042) 1.AD.30    (IUPAC: mercury dilead amalgam)
Leadhillite (Y: 1832) 5.BF.40    (IUPAC: tetralead dihydro sulfate dicarbonate)
Lechatelierite (a mineraloid)
Lecontite (Y: 1858) 7.CD.15    (IUPAC: ammonium sodium sulfate dihydrate)
Lecoqite-(Y) (IMA2008-069) 5.0  [no]  (IUPAC: sodium yttrium carbonate hexahydrate)
Leesite (IMA2016-064) 4.0  [no] [no]
Lefontite (IMA2014-075) 8.0  [no] [no] (IUPAC: diiron dialuminium beryllium hexahydro diphosphate)
Legrandite (Y: 1932) 8.DC.10    (IUPAC: dizinc hydro arsenate monohydrate)
Leguernite (IMA2013-051) 7.A0.  [no] [no] (Bi12.67O14(SO4)5)
Lehmannite (arsmirandite: IMA2017-057a) 8.0  [no] [no]
Lehnerite (8.EB.10: IMA1986-032) 8.EB.10    (IUPAC: manganese(II) diuranyl diphosphate octahydrate)
Leifite (leifite: IMA2002 s.p., 1915 Rd) 9.EH.25   
Leightonite (Y: 1938) 7.CC.70    (IUPAC: dipotassium dicalcium copper tetrasulfate dihydrate)
Leisingite (tellurium oxysalt: IMA1995-011) 4.FL.65    (IUPAC: copper dimagnesium tellurium(VI) hexaoxide hexahydrate)
Leiteite (IMA1976-026) 4.JA.05    (IUPAC: zinc diarsenic(III) tetraoxide)
Lemanskiite (IMA1999-037) 8.DG.05    (IUPAC: sodium calcium pentacopper chloro tetrarsenate pentahydrate)
Lemmleinite (labuntsovite) 9.CE.30d
Lemmleinite-Ba (IMA1998-052a) 9.CE.30d   [no]
Lemmleinite-K (IMA1997-003) 9.CE.30d   [no]
Lemoynite (lemoynite: IMA1968-013) 9.DP.35   
Lenaite (chalcopyrite: IMA1994-008) 2.CB.10a    (IUPAC: silver iron disulfide)
Lengenbachite (cylindrite: 1905) 2.HF.30    (Ag4Cu2Pb18As12S39)
Leningradite (IMA1988-014) 8.BH.65    (IUPAC: lead tricopper dichloro divanadate)
Lennilenapeite (stilpnomelane: IMA1982-085) 9.EG.40   
Lenoblite (IMA1970-002) 4.HG.60    (IUPAC: divanadium(IV) tetraoxide dihydrate)
Leogangite (IMA1998-032) 8.CC.15    (IUPAC: decacopper tetrarsenate hexahydro tetrasulfate octahydrate)
Leonardsenite (weberite: IMA2011-059) 3.0  [no]  (IUPAC: magnesium aluminium pentafluoride dihydrate)
Leonite (Y: 1896) 7.CC.55    (IUPAC: dipotassium magnesium disulfate tetrahydrate)
Leoszilardite (IMA2015-128) 5.0  [no] [no] (IUPAC: hexasodium magnesium diuranyl hexacarbonate hexahydrate)
Lepageite (arsenite-antimonite: IMA2018-028) 4.0  [no] [no]
Lepersonnite 5.EG.10
Lepersonnite-(Gd) (IMA1981-036) 5.EG.10   
Lepersonnite-(Nd) (IMA2021-066) 5.EG.10  [no] [no]
Lepidocrocite (lepidocrocite: IMA1980 s.p., 1944) 4.FE.15    (IUPAC: hydro γ-iron(III) oxide)
(Lepidolite, mica series (Y: 1905) 9.EC.20   ) Note: polylithionite-trilithionite series.
Lepkhenelmite-Zn (labuntsovite: IMA2003-003) 9.CE.30c   
Lermontovite (Y: 1957) 8.DN.15    (IUPAC: uranium(IV) hydro phosphate monohydrate)
Letovicite (Y: 1932) 7.AD.20    (IUPAC: triammonium sulfate hydrogen sulfate) 
Leucite (zeolitic tectosilicate: IMA1997 s.p., 1791) 9.GB.05   
Leucophanite (Y: 1842) 9.DH.05   
Leucophoenicite (humite: 1899) 9.AF.60    (IUPAC: heptamanganese(II) tri(tetraoxy silicate) dihydroxyl)
Leucophosphite (Y: 1932) 8.DH.10    (IUPAC: potassium diiron(III) hydro diphosphate dihydrate)
Leucosphenite (Y: 1901) 9.DP.15   
Leucostaurite (hilgardite: IMA2007-047) 6.EA.05  [no] [no]
Levantite (latiumite: IMA2017-010) 9.0  [no] [no]
Leverettite (atacamite: IMA2013-011) 3.0  [no] [no] (IUPAC: tricopper cobalt dichloride hexahydroxide)
Levinsonite-(Y) (sulfate-oxalate: IMA1996-057) 10.AB.70   
Lévyclaudite (cylindrite: IMA1989-034) 2.HF.25a   
Lévyne (zeolitic tectosilicate) 9.GD.15
Lévyne-Ca (IMA1997 s.p., 1825) 9.GD.15   
Lévyne-Na (IMA1997 s.p.) 9.GD.15   [no]
Leydetite (leydetite: IMA2012-065) 7.0  [no] [no] (IUPAC: iron uranyl disulfate undecahydrate)

Li – Ly 

Liandratite (IMA1975-039) 4.DH.35    (IUPAC: uranium(VI) diniobium octaoxide)
Liberite (IMA1967 s.p., 1964) 9.AA.10    (IUPAC: dilithium beryllium tetraoxysilicate)
Libethenite (andalusite: 1789) 8.BB.30    (IUPAC: dicopper hydro phosphate)
LiddicoatiteH 9.CK.05  [no] [no] (Note: no type material available, formally discredited 2011; former liddicoatite was renamed fluor-liddicoatite)
Liebauite (IMA1990-040) 9.DO.25    (IUPAC: tricalcium pentacopper hexacosaoxy nonasilicate)
Liebenbergite (olivine: IMA1972-033) 9.AC.05    (IUPAC: dinickel tetraoxysilicate)
Liebermannite (lingunite: IMA2013-128) 9.FA.  [no] [no] (IUPAC: potassium sodium octaoxy trisilicate)
Liebigite (Y: 1848) 5.ED.20    (IUPAC: dicalcium uranyl tricarbonate undecahydrate)
Liguowuite (IMA2020-097)  [no] [no] (IUPAC: tungsten trioxide)
Likasite (Y: 1955) 5.ND.05    (IUPAC: tricopper pentahydro nitrate dihydrate)
Lileyite (seidozerite, lamprophyllite: IMA2011-021) 9.BE.25  [no] 
Lillianite (lillianite: 1890) 2.JB.40a    
Lime (Y: 1882) 4.AB.25    (IUPAC: calcium oxide)
Limousinite (beryllophosphate zeolite: IMA2019-011) 7.0  [no] [no]
Linarite (linarite: 1822) 7.BC.65    (IUPAC: lead copper dihydro sulfate)
Lindackerite (lindacherite: IMA1995 s.p. Rd, 1853) 8.CE.30    (IUPAC: pentacopper diarsenate dihydroxoarsenate nonahydrate)
Lindbergite (humboltine: IMA2003-029) 10.AB.05   [no] (IUPAC: manganese(II) oxalate dihydrate)
Lindgrenite (Y: 1935) 7.GB.05    (IUPAC: tricopper dihydro dimolybdate(VI))
Lindqvistite (IMA1991-038) 4.CC.45    (IUPAC: dilead manganese(II) hexadecairon(III) heptacosaoxide)
Lindsleyite (crichtonite: IMA1982-086) 4.CC.40   
Lindströmite (meneghinite: IMA1975-005a) 2.HB.05a    (Pb3Cu3Bi7S15)
Línekite (IMA2012-066) 5.0  [no] [no] (IUPAC: dipotassium tricalcium di[uranyl tricarbonate] heptahydrate)
Lingbaoite (IMA2018-138) 2.0  [no] [no] (IUPAC: silver tritelluride)
Lingunite (lingunite: IMA2004-054) 9.FA.70   [no] (IUPAC: sodium aluminium octaoxy trisilicate)
Linnaeite (spinel, linnaeite: 1845) 2.DA.05    (IUPAC: cobalt(II) dicobalt(III) tetrasulfide)
Lintisite (IMA1989-025) 9.DB.15    (IUPAC: trisodium lithium dititanium dioxy tetra(trioxy silicate) dihydrate)
Linzhiite (silicide: IMA2010-011) 1.BB.20  [no]  (IUPAC: iron disilicide)
Liottite (cancrinite-sodalite: IMA1975-036) 9.FB.05   
Lipscombite (Y: 1953) 8.BB.90    (IUPAC: iron(II) diiron(III) dihydro diphosphate)
Lipuite (IMA2014-085) 9.0  [no] [no]
Liraite (IMA2019-085) 8.0  [no] [no]
Liroconite (Y: 1822) 8.DF.20    (IUPAC: dicopper aluminium tetrahydro arsenate tetrahydrate)
Lisanite (IMA2021-014)  [no] [no]
Lisetite (IMA1985-017) 9.FA.55    (IUPAC: disodium calcium tetraluminium tetra(tetraoxy silicate))
Lishizhenite (IMA1989-002) 7.CB.75    (IUPAC: zinc diiron(III) tetrasulfate tetradecahydrate)
Lisiguangite (IMA2007-003) 2.GA.25    (IUPAC: copper platinum bismuth trisulfide)
Lisitsynite (IMA2000-008) 9.FA.25   [no] (IUPAC: potassium boron hexaoxy disilicate)
Liskeardite (Y: 1874) 8.DF.10   
Lislkirchnerite (IMA2015-064) 5.N?.  [no] (IUPAC: hexalead aluminium octahydro dichloro pentanitrate dihydrate)
Litharge (Y: 1917) 4.AC.20    (IUPAC: lead oxide)
Lithiomarsturite (rhodonite: IMA1988-035) 9.DK.05   
Lithiophilite (olivine: 1878) 8.AB.10    (IUPAC: lithium manganese(II) phosphate)
Lithiophorite (Y: 1870) 4.FE.25   
Lithiophosphate (Y: 1957) 8.AA.20    (IUPAC: trilithium phosphate)
Lithiotantite (IMA1982-022) 4.DB.40    (IUPAC: lithium tritantalum octaoxide)
Lithiowodginite (wodginite: IMA1988-011) 4.DB.40    (IUPAC: lithium tritantalum octaoxide)
Lithosite (IMA1982-049) 9.GB.05    (IUPAC: tripotassium dialuminium dodecaoxy tetrasilicate hydroxyl)
Litidionite (IMA2014-C, 1880) 9.DG.70    (IUPAC: potassium sodium copper decaoxy tetrasilicate)
Litochlebite (watkinsonite: IMA2009-036) 2.HB.20e  [no] [no] (IUPAC: disilver lead tetrabismuth octaselenide)
Litvinskite (lovozerite: IMA1999-017) 9.CJ.15a   [no]
Liudongshengite (IMA2019-044) 5.0  [no] [no]
Liuite (corundum: IMA2017-042a) 4.CB.  [no] [no] (IUPAC: iron titanium trioxide)
Liveingite (sartorite: 1902) 2.HC.05c    (Pb20As24S56)
Liversidgeite (IMA2008-048) 8.0  [no] [no] (IUPAC: hexazinc tetraphosphate heptahydrate)
Livingstonite (Y: 1874) 2.JA.05i    (HgSb4S6(S)2)
Lizardite (serpentine: 1956) 9.ED.15    (IUPAC: trimagnesium pentaoxy disilicate tetrahydroxyl)
Llantenesite (spangolite: IMA2018-111) 7.0  [no] [no] (IUPAC: hexacopper dodecahydro chloro selenate trihydrate)
Lobanovite (astrophyllite, devitoite: IMA2015-B, 1963) 9.DC.05   
Lokkaite-(Y) (tengerite: IMA1969-045) 5.CC.15    (IUPAC: calcium tetrayttrium heptacarbonate nonahydrate)
Löllingite (löllingite: 1845) 2.EB.15a    (IUPAC: iron diarsenide)
Lombardoite (brackebuschite: IMA2016-058) 8.0  [no] [no] (IUPAC: dibarium manganese(III) hydro diarsenate)
Lomonosovite (seidozerite, murmanite: IMA1967 s.p., 1950) 9.BE.32    (IUPAC: hexasodium dititanium disodium dititanium di(heptaoxy disilicate) diphosphate tetraoxy)
Londonite (rhodizite: IMA1999-014) 6.GC.05    (IUPAC: cesium tetraberyllium tetraluminium octacosaoxo (undecaboron beryllium))
Lonecreekite (alum: IMA1982-063) 7.CC.20    (IUPAC: ammonium iron(III) disulfate dodecahydrate)
Lonsdaleite (IMA1966-044) 1.CB.10b    (Note: pseudohexagonal allotrope of carbon (Németh et al., 2014). Meteoric lonsdaleite might be valid)
Loomisite (IMA2022-003)
Loparite-(Ce) (oxide perovskite: IMA1987 s.p., 1923) 4.CC.35   
Lopatkaite (IMA2012-083) 2.0  [no] [no] (Pb5Sb3AsS11)
Lópezite (IMA2007 s.p., 1937) 7.FD.05    (IUPAC: potassium dichromate(VI))
Lorándite (2007 s.p., 1894) 2.HD.05    (IUPAC: thallium arsenide disulfide)
Loranskite-(Y) (IMA1987 s.p., 1899) 4.DG.05    (Note: an ill-defined material)
Lorenzenite (Y: 1901) 9.DB.10    (IUPAC: disodium dititanium trioxy (hexaoxy disilicate)) 
Loseyite (Y: 1929) 5.BA.30    (IUPAC: tetramanganese(II) trizinc decahydoxo dicarbonate)
Lotharmeyerite (tsumcorite: IMA1982-060 Rd) 8.CG.15    (IUPAC: calcium dizinc diarsenate dihydrate)
Loudounite (IMA1982-013) 9.HF.10   
Loughlinite (IMA1967 s.p., 1960) 9.EE.25   
Lourenswalsite (IMA1987-005) 9.EJ.05   
Lovdarite (zeolitic tectosilicate: IMA1972-009) 9.GF.15   
Loveringite (crichtonite: IMA1977-023) 4.CC.40   
Lovozerite (lovozerite: 1939) 9.CJ.15a   
Löweite (Y: 1847) 7.CC.45    (IUPAC: dodecasodium heptamagnesium tridecasulfate pentadecahydrate)
Luanheite (amalgam: IMA1983-083) 1.AD.15b    (IUPAC: trisilver mercury amalgam)
Luanshiweiite (mica: IMA2011-102) 9.E?.  [no] [no]
Luberoite (IMA1990-047) 2.BC.35    (IUPAC: pentaplatinum tetraselenide)
Luboržákite (pavonite: IMA2019-125) 2.0  [no] [no] (IUPAC: dimanganese pentasulfa arsenide antimonide)
Lucabindiite (lucabindiite: IMA2011-010) 8.0  [no] [no] (potassium,ammonium) (chloro,bromo) di(trioxo diarsenic)
Lucasite-(Ce) (IMA1986-020) 4.DH.10    (IUPAC: cerium dititanium hydro pentaoxide)
Lucchesiite (tourmaline: IMA2015-043) 9.0  [no]
Luddenite (IMA1981-032) 9.HH.10   
Ludjibaite (IMA1987-009) 8.BD.25    (IUPAC: pentacopper tetrahydro diphosphate)
Ludlamite (Y: 1885) 8.CD.20    (IUPAC: triiron(II) diphosphate tetrahydrate)
Ludlockite (IMA1969-046) 4.JA.45    (IUPAC: lead tetrairon(III) decarsenic(III) docosaoxide)
Ludwigite (ludwigite: 1874) 6.AB.30    (IUPAC: dimagnesium iron(III) dioxoborate)
Lueshite (oxide perovskite: IMA1962 s.p., 1959) 4.CC.30    (IUPAC: sodium niobium trioxide)
Luetheite (chenevixite: IMA1976-011) 8.DD.05    (IUPAC: dicopper dialuminium tetrahydro diarsenate monohydrate)
Lukechangite-(Ce) (IMA1996-033) 5.BD.05    (IUPAC: trisodium dicerium fluoro tetracarbonate)
Lukkulaisvaaraite (IMA2013-115) 2.0  [no] [no] (Pd14Ag2Te9)
Lukrahnite (tsumcorite: IMA1999-030) 8.CG.20   [no]
Lulzacite (IMA1998-039) 8.BK.25   [no] (IUPAC: distrontium triiron(II) tetraluminium decahydro tetraphosphate)
Lumsdenite (vanarsite: IMA2018-092) 4.0  [no] [no]
Lüneburgite (Y: 1870) 6.AC.60    (IUPAC: trimagnesium [diborate hexahydro diphosphate] hexahydrate)
Lunijianlaite (corrensite: IMA1989-056) 9.EC.60    Note: a regular 1:1 interstratification of cookeite and pyrophyllite.
Lun'okite (overite: IMA1982-058) 8.0    (IUPAC: magnesium manganese(II) aluminium hydro diphosphate tetrahydrate)
Luobusaite (silicide: IMA2005-052a) 1.BB.25    (Fe0.84Si2)
Luogufengite (IMA2016-005) 4.0  [no] [no] (IUPAC: diiron trioxide)
Lusernaite-(Y) (IMA2011-108) 5.0  [no]  (IUPAC: tetrayttrium aluminium undeca(hydro,fluoro) dicarbonate hexahydrate)
Lussierite (IMA2018-101) 8.0  [no] [no] (IUPAC: decasodium [uranyl tetrasulfate] disulfate triwater)
Luxembourgite (IMA2018-154) 2.0  [no] [no]
Luzonite (stannite: 1874) 2.KA.10    (IUPAC: tricopper arsenide tetrasulfide)
Lyonsite (IMA1986-041) 8.AB.40    (IUPAC: tricopper(II) tetrairon(III) hexavanadate)

External links
IMA Database of Mineral Properties/ RRUFF Project
Mindat.org - The Mineral Database
Webmineral.com
Mineralatlas.eu minerals K and L